Actinodaphne lanata is a species of plant in the family Lauraceae. It is endemic to the Nilgiris of Tamil Nadu, India.

References

lanata
Flora of Tamil Nadu
Critically endangered plants
Taxonomy articles created by Polbot